Ernest Hayter (31 July 1913, Poole, Dorset – 16 December 2005, Southampton, Hampshire) was an English first-class cricketer. A right-handed batsman and a leg break bowler, he made his first-class debut for Hampshire in the 1935 County Championship, playing a single match against Derbyshire.

In 1937 Hayter played two further first-class matches against Cambridge University and Northamptonshire.

Hayter died at Southampton, Hampshire in December 2005.

External links
Ernest Hayter at Cricinfo
Ernest Hayter at CricketArchive

1913 births
2005 deaths
Sportspeople from Bournemouth
Cricketers from Dorset
English cricketers
Hampshire cricketers